This is a list of New Zealand first-class cricket records; that is, record team and individual performances in first-class cricket for Auckland, Canterbury, Central Districts, Northern Districts, Otago, and Wellington, teams representing New Zealand (at various levels), both in New Zealand and overseas, and other first-class teams in New Zealand.

Team records

Highest innings total

777 Canterbury v Otago at Christchurch 1996/97
752-8d New South Wales v Otago at Dunedin 1923/24
726 Northern Districts v Canterbury at Rangiora 2009/10
693-9d Auckland v Canterbury at Auckland 1939/40
680–8 New Zealand v India at Wellington 2013/14
671–4 New Zealand v Sri Lanka at Wellington 1990/91
663 Australia v New Zealand at Auckland 1920/21

Lowest innings totals

13 Auckland v Canterbury at Auckland 1877/78
19 Wellington v Nelson at Nelson 1885/86
22 Wellington v Canterbury at Wellington 1903/04
25 Canterbury v Otago at Christchurch 1866/67
26 New Zealand v England at Auckland 1954/55

Note: (N)=Nelson, (NSW)=New South Wales

Highest fourth innings totals

Largest victories

By an innings and
365 runs Sims' Australian XI defeated Canterbury at Christchurch 1913/14
358 runs Australia defeated NZ at Wellington 1904/05 (not a test)
356 runs Australia defeated Otago at Dunedin 1949/50

By runs
512 runs Wellington defeated Auckland at Wellington 1925/26
446 runs Wellington defeated Otago at Wellington 1926/27
438 runs Auckland defeated Wellington at Auckland 1934/35

Tied matches
 Wellington v Nelson at Wellington 1883/84
 NZ v T.N. Pearce's XI at Scarborough 1958
 Central Districts v England XI at New Plymouth 1977/78
 Victoria v NZ at Melbourne 1982/83
 Wellington v Canterbury at Wellington 1988/89

Close finishes

Victory by 1 wicket
(29 instances) most recent
 Central Districts defeated Canterbury at New Plymouth 2009/10
 Northern Districts defeated Central Districts at Napier 2004/05

Victory by runs

 1 run Northern Districts defeated Central Districts at Rotorua 1989/90
 2 runs Auckland defeated Canterbury at Auckland 1903/04
 2 runs Wellington defeated Canterbury Wellington 1935/36
 3 Runs (5 instances)

Victory after following on

Batting records

Most matches, most runs, most centuries, highest average: for a province

Players in bold are still active.

T.G. McIntosh has played the most matches for Auckland: 102
W.K. Lees has played the most matches for Otago: 108
† for players who have scored more than 2000 runs.

Highest innings

385 Bert Sutcliffe Otago v Canterbury at Christchurch 1952/53
355 Bert Sutcliffe Otago v Auckland at Dunedin 1949/50
338* Roger Blunt Otago v Canterbury at Christchurch 1931/32
336* Wally Hammond England v New Zealand at Auckland 1932/33
334 Dean Brownlie Northern Districts v Central Districts at New Plymouth 2014/15
327* Devon Conway Wellington v Canterbury at Wellington 2019/20
317 Ken Rutherford New Zealand v D.B.Close XI at Scarborough 1986
316* Michael Papps Wellington v Auckland at Wellington 2017/18
306 Mark Richardson New Zealand v Zimbabwe A at Kwekwe 2000/01
302 Brendon McCullum New Zealand v India at Wellington 2013/14
301 Peter Fulton Canterbury v Auckland at Christchurch 2002/2003
299 Martin Crowe New Zealand v Sri Lanka at Wellington 1990/91

Highest partnerships

First wicket
432 M.H.W. Papps & L.J. Woodcock, Wellington v Auckland at Wellington 2017/18
428 P.J. Ingram & J.M. How, Central Districts v Wellington at Wellington 2009/10
387 G.M. Turner & T.W Jarvis, NZ v West Indies at Georgetown 1971/72

Second wicket
317 R.T Hart & P.S. Briasco, Central Districts v Canterbury at New Plymouth 1983/84
315* H.H. Gibbs & J.H. Kallis, South Africa v NZ at Christchurch 1998/99
303 C.S. Dempster & C.F.W. Allcott, NZ v Warwickshire at Birmingham 1927

Third wicket
467 A.H Jones & M.D Crowe, NZ v Sri Lanka at Wellington 1990/91
445 P.E. Whitelaw & W.N. Carson, Auckland v Otago at Dunedin 1936/37
394* P.G. Kennedy & R.T. Latham, Canterbury v Northern Districts at Rotorua 1990/91

Fourth wicket
350 Mustaq Mohammad & Asif Iqbal, Pakistan v NZ at Dunedin 1972/73
324 J.R. Reid & W.M. Wallace, NZ v Cambridge University Cambridge 1949
310 J.D. Ryder & N.R. Parlane, Wellington v Central Districts at Palmerston North 2004/05

Fifth wicket
347* M.J. Horne & A.C. Barnes, Auckland v Northern Districts at Auckland 2003/04
341 G.R. Larsen & E.B. McSweeney, Wellington v Central Districts at Levin 1987/88
319 K.R. Rutherford & E.J. Gray, NZ v DB Close's XI at Scarbourough 1986

Sixth wicket
379* S.L. Stewart & C.F.K. van Wyk, Canterbury v Central Districts at New Plymouth 2009/10
377 C. Munro & Craig Cachopa, Auckland v Wellington at Auckland 2012/13
352 B.J. Watling & B.B. McCullum, New Zealand v India at Wellington 2013/14

Seventh wicket
265 J.L. Powell & N. Dorreen, Canterbury v Otago at Christchurch 1929/30
261 A.D.R. Campbell & P.A. Strang, Zimbabwe v Canterbury at Timaru 1997/98
250 C.J. Nevin & M.D.J. Walker, Wellington v Otago at Wellington 2003/04

Eighth wicket
433 V.T. Trumper & A. Sims, Sim's Australian XI v Canterbury at Christchurch 1913/14
256 S.P. Fleming & J.E.C. Franklin, NZ v South Africa at Cape Town 2005/06
253 N.J Astle & A.C. Parore, NZ v Australia at Perth 2001/02

Ninth wicket
239 H.B. Cave & I.B. Leggat, Central Districts v Otago at Dunedin 1952/53
225 L.J. Woodcock & M.J. Tugaga, Wellington v Central Districts at Wellington 2009/10
209 P.J. Wiseman & B.P. Martin, New Zealand A v Sri Lanka A at Christchurch 2003/04

Tenth wicket
184 R.C. Blunt & W. Hawksworth, Otago v Canterbury at Christchurch 1931/32
160 L.K. Germon & W.A. Wisneski, Canterbury v Northern Districts at Rangiora 1997/98
151 B.F. Hastings & R.O. Collinge, NZ v Pakistan at Auckland 1972/73

Most runs and highest average in a season

Note: (E)=England, (V)=Victoria, (P)=Pakistan (OZ)=Australia (NSW)=New South Wales (SA)=South Africa (W)=Wellington

† more than 500 runs

Most centuries in a season
8 M.D Crowe 1986/87
6 E. de C. Weekes (WI) 1955/56 
6 G.A. Hick 1988/89
6 M.D. Bell 2000/01
5 G.M. Turner 1975/76
5 P.G. Fulton 2012/13
(22 players have scored 4 centuries in a Season)

Two centuries in a match
(37 instances)

(Only Arthur Fagg has ever scored 2 double-centuries in a match 244 & 202*, Kent v Essex at Colchester, 1938)

Most runs in a career

Most of the players on this list scored a lot of their runs for overseas teams. Where this is the case the number of runs and the names of the teams are included. Players in bold are still active.

Best average in a career

Qualification: More than 3000 runs. Players in bold are still active.

Redpath Cup – Won most times

The Redpath Cup is awarded to the best batsman in a season for performances in first-class cricket.

6 times Bert Sutcliffe
5 times John Reid
4 times Stewie Dempster
4 times Glenn Turner
4 times Martin Crowe
3 times Lawrie Miller
3 times Graham Dowling
3 times Geoff Howarth
3 times Ross Taylor
3 times Kane Williamson

Bowling records

Most wickets for one province

Best bowling in a match

16–130 A.R. Tait Northern Districts v Auckland at Hamilton 1996/97
15–60 S.T. Callaway Canterbury v Hawkes Bay at Napier 1903/04
15–94 F.H. Cooke Otago v Canterbury at Christchurch 1882/83
15–104 S.L Boock Otago v Auckland at Dunedin 1989/90
15–123 R.J. Hadlee New Zealand v Australia at Brisbane 1985/86

Note: (HB)=Hawkes Bay, (S)=Southland, (N)=Nelson

Four Wickets with Consecutive Balls
 A.D. Downes Otago v Auckland at Dunedin 1893/94
 N. Wagner Otago v Wellington at Queenstown 2010/11†

†Wagner took five wickets in one over.

Hat Tricks
(38 Instances)

Best bowling in an innings

10–28 A.E Moss Canterbury v Wellington at Christchurch 1889/90
9–13 P.J. Wiseman Canterbury v Central Districts at Christchurch 2004/05
9–36 A.F. Wensley Auckland v Otago at Auckland 1929/30
9–47 T.H. Dent Hawkes Bay v Wellington at Napier 1900/01
9–48 A.R. Tait Northern Districts v Auckland at Hamilton 1996/97
9–52 R.J. Hadlee New Zealand v Australia at Brisbane 1985/86
9–55 R.J. Hadlee New Zealand v West Zone at Rajkot 1988/89

Note (Q)=Queensland, (NZ-23)=NZ under 23 XI

Most wickets in a season

Most wickets in a career

Most of the players high on this list took a lot of their wickets for overseas teams. Where this is the case the number of wickets and the names of the teams are included.

†Grimmett was born in Dunedin, grew up in NZ, played the first 9 matches of his career for Wellington, and then moved to Australia.

‡Smith was born in Trinidad, played for West Indian teams for the first 5 years of his career, then played for Northamptonshire and West Indian teams for 10 years, and finally played for NZ teams for the last 12 years of his career. Died in Auckland.

§ Saunders was born in Melbourne. Played for Australian teams from 1899 to 1910. Played for Wellington for the last 5 years of his career. Played 1 match for NZ. Died in Melbourne.

Best average in a career

Qualification: More than 200 wickets.

Winsor Cup – Won most times

The Winsor Cup is awarded to the best bowler in a season for performances in first-class cricket.

13 times Richard Hadlee
5 times Chris Martin
4 times Chris Cairns
3 times Jack Cowie
3 times Tom Burtt
3 times Bob Blair
3 times Dick Motz
3 times Richard Collinge
3 times Danny Morrison
3 times Daniel Vettori

All rounders' Records

A century and 5 wickets twice in the same match

W.W. Armstrong 126*, 5–27 & 5–25 Australia v New Zealand (not test) at Christchurch 1904/05
J.N.Crawford 110 & 4*, 5–90 & 5–53 Wellington v Auckland 1917/18
(Only George Hirst has ever scored 2 centuries and taken 5 wickets twice in the same match, 111 & 117*, 6–70 & 5–45, Yorkshire v Somerset, 1906)

A century and 10 wickets in the same match

F.E. Woolley 132, 6–50 & 4–38 MCC v Otago at Dunedin 1929/30
D.N Patel 6 & 204, 6–117 & 4–116 Auckland v Northern Districts at Auckland 1991/92

A century and 5 wickets in an innings of the same match
(41 instances)
Most recent
 T.G. Southee 156, 5–69 & 2–75 Northern Districts v Wellington at Wellington 2012/13
 B.J. Diamanti 0, 135* & 5–74 Central Districts v Canterbury at Rangiora 2008/09
 T.K. Canning 115 & 6–44, 2–28 Auckland v Northern Districts at Hamilton 2004/05
 G.E. Bradburn 35, 104 & 5–114 Northern Districts v Wellington at Wellington 2000/01

Most times
 J.R. Reid 3 times
 B.R. Taylor 2 times
 M.D. Crowe 2 times

500 runs and 25 wickets in the same season

2000 runs and 150 wickets for a province

No player has scored 2000 runs and taken 150 wickets for Otago

3750 runs and 375 wickets in a career

Players in bold still active

The order of the players on this list is determined by: Batting average minus Bowling average. The greater the positive difference, the higher he is on the list.

Wicket keeping records

Most dismissals for one province

Most dismissals in a match

There are 8 instances of 9 dismissals in a match.

Most dismissals in an innings

There are 15 instances of 6 dismissals in an innings.

Most dismissals in a season

 49 (49 catches / 0 stumpings) C.J. Nevin 2001/02
 44 (43/1) D.C. de Boorder 2011/12
 43 (41/2) B.J. Watling 2013/14
 41 (31/10) E.B. McSweeney 1984/85
 41 (35/6) E.B. McSweeney 1989/90

Most dismissals in a career

Players in bold are still active.

Fielding records

Most catches in a match

7 J.F.M. Morrison, Wellington v Northern Districts at Wellington 1980/81
7 S.P. Fleming, NZ v Zimbabwe at Harare 1997/98
6 (16 instances)

Most catches in an innings

(12 instances of 5 catches) Most recent
 5 M.S. Sinclair, Central Districts v Wellington at Wellington 2010/11
 5 J.M. Brodie, Wellington v Otago at Wellington 2008/09
 5 J.M. Myburgh, Canterbury v Auckland at Rangiora 2008/09
 5 C.Z. Harris, Canterbury v England at Christchurch 2001/02
 5 S.P. Fleming, NZ v Zimbabwe at Harare 1997/98
 5 J.J. Crowe, Auckland v Canterbury at Auckland 1988/89

Most catches in a season

 23 B.A.G Murray 1967/68
 22 J.V. Coney 1977/78
 20 H.J. Howarth 1973/74

References
 2006 New Cricket Almanack

Specific

Records
Cricket records and statistics
First-class cricket records